UGPS J0521+3640 is a nearby brown dwarf of spectral class T8.5, located in constellation Auriga. It was discovered in 2011 using United Kingdom Infrared Telescope (UKIRT), UKIRT Infrared Deep Sky Survey (UKIDSS), UGPS (UKIDSS Galactic Plane Survey) component, 6th data release.

Its photometric distance estimate is 8.2 pc, or 26.7 ly.

See also
 List of star systems within 25–30 light-years

References

Brown dwarfs
T-type stars
Auriga (constellation)
UGPS objects